The 1987 New Zealand bravery awards were announced via a Special Honours List on 27 August 1987, and recognised ten people for acts of bravery between 1984 and 1986.

George Medal (GM)
 Robin Jamieson Dudding (deceased) – traffic officer, Ministry of Transport, Rotorua.

Queen's Gallantry Medal (QGM)
 Stephen Anthony Linney – constable, New Zealand Police.

 Peter Thomas Button  – pilot, Capital Helicopters Ltd.

Queen's Commendation for Brave Conduct
 Katherine Agnes Burrell – prison nurse, Department of Justice, Wellington.

 Joseph Kauika – of Taihape.

 Clive Alan Button – of Wellington.

 Sapper Alan Leslie McAlley (deceased) – Corps of Royal New Zealand Engineers, 1st Field Squadron Sappers' Brigade, Papakura Camp.

 Wayne Michael Hunt – traffic officer, Ministry of Transport, Tokoroa.

 Private Dean Harry Emerson – Royal New Zealand Infantry Regiment.

Queen's Commendation for Valuable Service in the Air
 Derek Walter Lowe – of Murupara.

References

Bravery
Bravery awards
New Zealand bravery awards